Gabbro Crest is the crest,  high, of the mountain spur between the Sheriff Cliffs and the Vigen Cliffs on the southeastern edge of Saratoga Table, in the Forrestal Range, Antarctica. It was so named in 1979 by the Advisory Committee on Antarctic Names, at the suggestion of Arthur B. Ford, a United States Geological Survey geologist, after gabbro, the dominant rock type of the Forrestal Range.

References

Mountains of Queen Elizabeth Land
Pensacola Mountains